The Androscoggin Swinging Bridge (also known simply as the Swinging Bridge) is a pedestrian suspension bridge spanning the Androscoggin River in Maine between the towns of Topsham in Sagadahoc County and Brunswick in Cumberland County.  The bridge was built in 1892 as a timesaving approach for employees of the Cabot Manufacturing Company of Brunswick, could have safer and easier passage across the river.

Design

History

19th century
Topsham Heights was a neighborhood that was inhabited by a large Franco-American population recruited from Canada to work in the mills. The bridge has helped thousands of people walk to and from the Cabot Manufacturing Company  cotton mill building located on the other side of the river in Brunswick.

In  the Topsham Land Company decided that a footbridge spanning across the Androscoggin River would be a safer, more direct route than the Free Bridge (as it was called then), as it was not conducive to pedestrian traffic. The company hired John A. Roebling's Sons Company, the engineering firm that designed the Brooklyn Bridge in New York City, as well as many other bridges around the world. In , both towns of Brunswick and Topsham became responsible for the repairs of the bridge.

20th century
Between 1913 and 1916, the bridge's timber-framed towers were replaced with steel by Meguire & Jones, a steel metal fabrication company in South Portland.

At 5:00am on March 20, 1936, a freshet destroyed the superstructure of the bridge. Ice and logs from the Androscoggin River crashed up alongside the bridge isolating Topsham from Brunswick. Both the steel towers and suspension cables survived the flood. The federal Works Progress Administration (WPA) replaced the damaged span and filled in the towers with concrete in 1938.

21st century

In , a study performed by both towns found the bridge damaged in many locations including the concrete abutments,  the wood planks and rust on all the metal. In  Brunswick and Topsham appointed a committee of residents from both towns who secured funding from the Maine Department of Transportation as well as corporate grants to reconstruct the bridge. In 2007, public parks opened on both sides of the bridge. Two of John A. Roebling’s great-great-great granddaughters spoke at the dedication ceremony on September 8, 2007.

In May 2011, the bridge was dedicated as a Maine Historic Civil Engineering Landmark by the Maine Section of the American Society of Civil Engineers. The Society paid for the installation of a commemorative plaque.

See also
National Register of Historic Places listings in Cumberland County, Maine
List of bridges on the National Register of Historic Places in Maine

References

External links
Save Our Bridge non-profit organization

Bridges on the National Register of Historic Places in Maine
Suspension bridges in Maine
Bridges completed in 1892
Buildings and structures in Brunswick, Maine
Buildings and structures in Topsham, Maine
Bridges in Cumberland County, Maine
Bridges in Sagadahoc County, Maine
National Register of Historic Places in Cumberland County, Maine
National Register of Historic Places in Sagadahoc County, Maine
Pedestrian bridges in the United States
Pedestrian bridges on the National Register of Historic Places
Steel bridges in the United States
Androscoggin County, Maine